Sagiolechiaceae is a small family of lichen-forming fungi in the order Ostropales. It contains two genera, Rhexophiale, and Sagiolechia, the type genus. The family was circumscribed in 2010 by lichenologists Elisabeth Baloch, Robert Lücking, H. Thorsten Lumbsch, and Mats Wedin. Molecular phylogenetic analysis showed that the two genera formed a distinct clade in Ostropales. Four species were included in the original circumscription of the family.

Some Sagiolechiaceae species form crustose lichens with Trentepohlia-like photobiont partners (a genus of green algae); other do not form a thallus and are lichenicolous (i.e., they grow on other lichens). Asci are eight-spored with colourless ascospores that have transverse septa or are muriform (i.e. divided into chambers by both transverse and longitudinal septa). The genera Sagiolechia and Rhexophiale mainly differ from each other in how their fruiting bodies develop.

References

Ostropales
Lecanoromycetes families
Taxa described in 2010
Taxa named by Robert Lücking
Taxa named by Helge Thorsten Lumbsch
Lichen families